Kevin Hobbs (born April 30, 1983 in Tampa, Florida) is a former American football cornerback. He was signed by the Seattle Seahawks as an undrafted free agent in 2006. He played college football at Auburn University.

Hobbs has also played for the Atlanta Falcons, Detroit Lions and Miami Dolphins.

Early years
Hobbs played high school football at Tampa Bay Tech in Tampa, Florida. He was a two-year starter on varsity - he had a team high in interceptions as a junior and senior. Hobbs was a two-time All Western Conference selection at cornerback. As a senior, he participated in the Hillsborough County All Star Game and was selected as a National Football Foundation Scholar-Athlete.  He was a member of the senior class that won the school's first ever District Championship in 2000.

Professional career

Seattle Seahawks
Hobbs was undrafted in the National Football League after graduating from Auburn University. He started his second professional season on the Seattle Seahawks practice squad, but was signed to the active roster as the team's 5th cornerback on October 2, 2007.

On November 12, 2007 the Seahawks released him. He was re-signed to the practice squad, but later promoted to the full roster again after safety C. J. Wallace was placed on injured reserve.

Hobbs was waived on September 5, 2009.

Detroit Lions
On September 6, 2009, Hobbs was claimed off waivers by the Detroit Lions. He was released on April 16, 2010.

Miami Dolphins
Hobbs signed with the Miami Dolphins on August 12, 2010.  He was released on September 4, 2010.

References

External links
Auburn Tigers bio
Seattle Seahawks bio

1983 births
Living people
Players of American football from Tampa, Florida
American football cornerbacks
Auburn Tigers football players
Seattle Seahawks players
Atlanta Falcons players
Detroit Lions players
Miami Dolphins players